"Revolution" is a song by American hip hop group Arrested Development, from the soundtrack to the 1992 film Malcolm X.

Background
Speech has expressed gratitude for the film's depiction of a "side" of Malcolm X which shares the perspective of Arrested Development. Spike Lee, the director of the film, had asked Speech to write a song for it. Speech considered it a personal responsibility to "acknowledge that there is a need for struggle, because of all the bad things going on in the nation", which is reflected in the line "Am I doing as much as I can for the struggle?" He composed the song with a purpose to urge people into action in bringing about change.

Music video
The music video was directed by Spike Lee. It was shot in a high school, a city block, and a street in Brooklyn with "about 500 extras". Each location had at least 100 people in the filming. According to Speech, the video was shot in seven hours.

Charts

References

1992 singles
1992 songs
Arrested Development (group) songs